Echinoneidae is a family of echinoderms belonging to the order Echinoneoida.

Genera:
 Amblypygus L.Agassiz, 1840
 Duperieria Roman, 1968
 Echinoneus Leske, 1778
 Echinoneus van Phelsum, 1774
 Koehleraster Lambert & Thiéry, 1921
 Micropetalon A.Agassiz & H.L.Clark, 1907
 Paramblypygus Tessier & Roman, 1973
 Pseudohaimea Pomel, 1885

References

Echinoneoida
Echinoderm families